Tema Thermal Power Station is a  diesel fuel-fired thermal power station in Ghana.

Location
The coordinates of the power station are: 05°40'43.0"N, 0°00'55.0"E (Latitude:5.677362; Longitude:0.015828).

Overview
It was constructed in two stages. The first stage, known as TTPS1, with capacity of 110 megawatts, owned by the Volta River Authority (VRA), was commissioned in 2008. The first stage consists of 25 Caterpillar 3516B diesel generators, each rated at 2000 kVA.

The second stage, TTPS2, commissioned in 2012 as a privately-owned power project, with capacity of 50 MW, consists of 12 Caterpillar 3516 TA diesel generators, each rated at 1750 kVA. It is owned by CENIT Energy Limited (CEL). CEL’s sole shareholder, CENIT Investment Limited, is an investment company, wholly owned by the Social Security and National Insurance Trust (SSNIT), a Ghanaian enterprise. TTPS2 shares premises with TTPS1 and the two share a common control room, switch gear and other common facilities.

The power plant is connected to the electricity grid in Ghana and supplies energy to Tema and Accra.

See also 

Electricity sector in Ghana
List of power stations in Ghana
List of power stations in Africa

References

External links
Tema Thermal Power Complex

Oil-fired power stations in Ghana
Eastern Region (Ghana)